Don Gonzalo, Duke of Aquitaine (5 June 1937 – 27 May 2000) (Spanish: Gonzalo Víctor Alfonso José Bonifacio Antonio María y Todos los Santos de Borbón y Dampierre; French: Gonzalve Victor Alphonse Joseph Boniface Antoine Marie Toussaint de Bourbon) was a grandson of Alfonso XIII, King of Spain.

Life
Gonzalo was born in the Sant'Anna Clinic in Rome, the younger son of Infante Jaime, Duke of Segovia and of his first wife, Emmanuelle de Dampierre. He was baptised in the chapel of the hospital where he had been born.

In 1941, after the death of Alfonso XIII, Gonzalo moved with his family to Lausanne, Switzerland. They lived first at the Hotel Royal, before Gonzalo and his older brother Alfonso were sent to the Collège Saint-Jean in Fribourg. On 8 December 1946, Gonzalo received his First Communion and was confirmed by Cardinal Pedro Segura y Sáenz, Archbishop of Seville.

In 1953, Gonzalo visited Spain for the first time. The following year, General Francisco Franco allowed Gonzalo and Alfonso to continue their education in Spain.

In September 1955, Gonzalo and Alfonso were both injured in an automobile accident near Lausanne, on a return trip from Windsor during which they had driven all day and night.

In December 1959, Gonzalo's engagement to Dorothy Marguerite Fritz of San Francisco, daughter of Nicholas Eugene Fritz Jr., was announced.  A wealthy heiress, she owned the Huntington Hotel. The marriage never took place.

In November 1961, Alfonso and Gonzalo, concerned that their father was wasting away his money, sought an injunction from a French court to compel him to turn over management of his affairs to a court-appointed trustee, being supported in their action by their grandmother, Queen Victoria Eugenie, as well as by other members of the Spanish royal family. In January 1962, the court ruled that although there were insufficient grounds to find Jaime completely incompetent, a trustee was installed to restrain undue extravagance on his part.

On 28 January 1983, at Puerto Vallarta, Mexico, Gonzalo civilly wed María del Carmen Harto y Montealegre (born 23 April 1947 in Toledo). They were divorced less than three months later, 13 April, before the marriage had been registered in Spain.

In June 1984, Gonzalo married a model, María de las Mercedes Licer y García (born at Valencia  15 October 1963), in a civil service at Madrid on 25 June 1984 and in a religious ceremony at Olmedo, near Valladolid five days later. They separated 3 July 1985, divorced civilly 3 July 1986 which became final 31 January 1989, and Gonzalo was granted annulment by the Vatican at Florence in May 1995. Prior to that annulment, he became engaged to the actress Marcia Bell, but the couple did not marry. On 12 December 1992 in Genoa, Italy, Gonzalo was married in a civil ceremony to Emanuela Maria Pratolongo (born Genoa, 22 March 1960), daughter of Vincenzo Pratolongo and his wife, Sofia Hardouin dei duchi di Gallese. Following Gonzalo's annulment from the previous marriage, the couple were wed religiously 17 September 1995 in Rome.

Gonzalo had no children from any of his marriages. He did, however, have an illegitimate but acknowledged daughter, Stephanie Michelle de Borbón (born 19 June 1968 in Miami, Florida) by Sandra Lee Landry, who was married 27 July 1995 to Richard Carl McMasters II (born Florida, 25 March 1972). They have five sons, two of whom were born before their marriage and all of whom were born in Florida: 

 Nicholas Stefano Alessandro de Borbon McMasters (born 1994)
 Christian Alfonso de Borbon McMasters (born 1995)
 Jaime Sebastian McMasters de Borbon (born 1996)
 Richard Carl McMasters III (born 1998)
 Alexander Leandro Joaquin Gonzalo McMasters de Borbon (born 2004)

Gonzalo died of leukemia at Lausanne. He is buried in the Chapel of Saint Sebastian in the church of the Descalzas Reales in Madrid.

Rank and titles
Although noble, Gonzalo's mother was not of royal descent. Gonzalo's father signed a renunciation to the Spanish throne prior to the marriage, and thus Gonzalo and his brother were not in the line of succession to the Spanish throne in accordance with the Pragmatic Sanction of 1776. In Spain, Gonzalo was generally addressed as Don Gonzalo de Borbón y Dampierre.

Gonzalo was considered a French prince with the style His Royal Highness by those legitimists who believed that his grandfather Alfonso XIII was also the heir to the French throne.  After his grandfather's death and the accession of his father Jaime in 1941, Gonzalo was regarded as second in line to the legitimist French throne for many years until the birth of his nephew in 1972.

The internal family conflict over Gonzalo's rank and title continued throughout his life. In 1972, his uncle the Count of Barcelona invited him to the wedding of his daughter Margarita; the invitation did not recognise the royal rank of Gonzalo who wrote a letter of protest to his uncle.

On 8 March 1972, Jaime named Gonzalo a knight of the Order of the Holy Spirit and of the Order of Saint Michael; the declarative letters patent were dated 21 September 1972. Also on 21 September 1972, Jaime gave Gonzalo the title duc d'Aquitaine (Duke of Aquitaine). He was given the Grand Cross of the Order of Saints Maurice and Lazarus by Prince Vittorio Emanuele of Savoy; the document of investiture referred to him as "Duke of Aquitaine".

Ancestors

Notes

1937 births
2000 deaths
House of Bourbon (Spain)
Nobility from Rome
Deaths from cancer in Switzerland
Deaths from leukemia
Dukes of Aquitaine